Hind Shoufani (Arabic:هند شوفاني) is a poet, director, and producer.

Career

Born 1978 in Lebanon and raised in Damascus and Amman, Shoufani has remained a refugee. She currently resides in the Middle East, but has traveled and lived in many cities. Both of her parents are Palestinian activists. Her father went to Princeton and has served as Palestine Liberation Organization leader and politician. He has written over twenty-five publications. Her mother is an American citizen with an English Literature degree. Shoufani began her education at the Lebanese American University in Beirut where she studied communicative arts. Later she received a scholarship for NYU in New York where she received a master's degree in filmmaking.

Shoufani has performed poetry at several events, including the Alwan for the Arts center in NYC, Howard University in Washington D.C., the Institute for Policy Studies in Washington, and the Berlin Poetry Festival in Germany. She has also hosted the Emirates Literacy Festival and the Sikka Art Fair. Shoufani is also the founder of Poeticians, an organization that hosts events for multilingual poets of all backgrounds gather in Dubai and Beirut to read their spoken word and poetry.
She has two publications of poetry, More Light Than Death Could Bear (Beirut, 2007) and Inkstains on the Edge of Light (Beirut, 2010). Her poetry often includes themes of love, death, lust, identity, Palestinian interests, freedom, and feminine issues.

In 2011, she participated in the International Writing Program Fall Residency at the University of Iowa in Iowa City, IA.

Poetry

Shoufani's poetry tackles issues of Palestine, freedom, feminist issues in the Arab world and promotes a different perspective on Arab women. Love, Lust, death and identity are main themes in the free verse poetry.

She is the founder of what is called Poeticians collective which is where all poets of all backgrounds read multilingual spoken word and poetry in Dubai and Beirut
Inkstains on the Edge of Light (Shoufani's second compilation of poetry) is a 300-page volume divided into four chapters - death, life, home and lust. It is a frank and personal journey through the loss of her beloved mother to cancer, she died at the young age of 42 when Hind was only 19. The distance from and simultaneous bond she feels with her activist father, the struggle and plight of being a Palestinian refugee and the sadness of unrequited love.

Her language is uncensored, vivid and at times painful to read. Whether she tackles war, love or family, her passion shines through the pages.

"It is a form of possession," Shoufani says of her work. "Whether I am possessed by a thought or a feeling or a spirit that takes over my body, I'm not sure, but I have to write. When something moves me, poetry comes out and it is not in my control. I know it can be tiring to read, but it is meant to be easily understood and accessible."
She says her character as a poet is parallel to her character in life - strong, independent, nonconformist and non-conservative. One of her aims is to convey her situation to other Arab women in order to empower them.

"I wish mine was the experience of all Arab women," she says, "and one of the reasons I still live in the Arab world is because I want to rally people around me and influence young people not to be confined by society or relationships or family or gender roles. I can only do this through film and poetry."

Born in Lebanon and raised in Damascus and Amman, Shoufani says she belongs "nowhere and everywhere".

For the reader new to her work Shoufani has a humble aim.
"I hope it helps them mourn and I hope it helps them appreciate lovers and friends," she says. "And, of course, I hope it helps tell a Palestinian story."

Bibliography

 Hind Shoufani. More Light Than Death Could Bear. Beirut, 2007. 
 Hind Shoufani. Inkstains on the Edge of Light. Whole World Press, 2010.

Films and Documentaries

 This War on Love: (In Development)- feature length drama. Expected release 2013
 Journey in Migration, feature documentary, 2010. (In Post-production)
 Guidebook to Forgetfulness, 60 minutes, 2009.
 Carencia, 24 P, feature length, 2005. Written, directed, produced and edited on Avid Express.
 New Roses, digital video, 13 minutes, 2003.  Written, directed, designed and edited on Avid Express.
 Medical Marijuana Barbie, video, 12 minutes, 2003.
 Places on the Inside, 16 mm film, B & W, 5 minutes, 2002.
 A Life the Color of Blood, video, 12 minutes, 1998.

References 

4.http://www.thenational.ae/arts-culture/books/telling-a-palestinian-story-through-poetry-hind-shoufani

5.http://www.thenational.ae/arts-culture/books/hind-shoufani-on-war-love-and-loss

6.http://www.alwanforthearts.org/event/3

External links 
 Author's website

21st-century Palestinian poets
Living people
1978 births
International Writing Program alumni
Palestinian women poets
20th-century Palestinian women writers
20th-century Palestinian writers
21st-century Palestinian women writers
Palestinian poets